Nish Kish (also Romanized as Nīsh Kīsh) is a village in Rezqabad Rural District, in the Central District of Esfarayen County, North Khorasan Province, Iran. At the 2006 census, its population was 135, in 35 families.

References 

Populated places in Esfarayen County